Babrungas eldership is an eldership in Plungė District Municipality to the northeast from Plungė, Lithuania. The administrative center is Babrungas.

Main villages 

 Babrungas
 Glaudžiai
 Jovaišiškė
 Truikiai
 Didvyčiai
 Užlieknis
 Pakerai
 Lieplaukalė

Other villages

References 

Elderships in Plungė District Municipality